Dominique Armani Jones (born December 3, 1994), known professionally as Lil Baby, is an American rapper from Atlanta, Georgia. He rose to mainstream fame in 2017 following the release of his mixtape Perfect Timing. His debut studio album, Harder Than Ever (2018), spawned the Billboard Hot 100 top 10 single "Yes Indeed" (with Drake). In 2018, he released two more mixtapes: Drip Harder (with Gunna), which contained the single, "Drip Too Hard", that reached #4 on the Billboard Hot 100, and was later certified Diamond by the Recording Industry Association of America (RIAA); and Street Gossip, which reached #2 on the US Billboard 200.

His second studio album, My Turn (2020), reached #1 on the Billboard 200 and is certified triple-platinum by the RIAA. The album spawned the singles, "We Paid" (with 42 Dugg) and "The Bigger Picture", both of which reached the top 10 on the Billboard Hot 100. In 2021, Lil Baby and rapper Lil Durk released the collaborative album The Voice of the Heroes, which became Lil Baby's second #1 Billboard 200 project. He collaborated with Drake on the songs "Wants and Needs", and "Girls Want Girls", and with Nicki Minaj on the 2022 single "Do We Have a Problem?", all three of which peaked at #2 on the Billboard Hot 100 chart. His feature on the song "Hurricane" by Kanye West, alongside The Weeknd, won him the Grammy Award for Best Melodic Rap Performance.

In addition to his Grammy Award, Lil Baby has received an MTV Video Music Award, and two BET Awards, and was crowned the biggest all-genre Artist of the Year at the Apple Music Awards 2020.

Early life
Jones was born and raised in the Oakland City neighborhood in southwestern Atlanta, Georgia. He was two years old when his father left the family. His mother raised him and his two sisters. He dropped out of Booker T. Washington High School in ninth grade and committed to drug dealing.

In early 2012, he was charged for possession with intent to sell, among other charges. In 2013, was charged with possession of marijuana of less than an ounce. In 2014, he was arrested on charges of possession of marijuana with intent to sell, and was incarcerated for two years.

Career

2015–2018: Career beginnings and Harder Than Ever
At age seventeen, Lil Baby was a regular presence in the studio of Atlanta-based Quality Control Records as a drug dealer. Label founder Kevin "Coach K" Lee encouraged him to become a rapper, as he felt Baby had "the swag... the lingo, [and] respect around the city". Fellow rappers Young Thug and Gunna served as Baby's mentors in developing his style. He released his first mixtape, Perfect Timing, in April 2017 with appearances from Young Thug and Lil Yachty. 

Another mixtape, Harder Than Hard, followed three months later. In October, he released his third mixtape in six months, 2 The Hard Way, a collaboration with friend and fellow Atlanta rapper Marlo. A fourth mixtape, Too Hard, was released in December, led by his hit single "Freestyle" and accompanying music video. It was certified gold by the RIAA in February 2020.

With his career gaining momentum, Baby released his debut studio album, Harder Than Ever, in May 2018. It debuted at number three on the US Billboard 200. The album was supported by the singles "Southside" and "Yes Indeed" (with Drake), the latter peaked at number six on the Billboard Hot 100. "Life Goes On" featuring Lil Uzi Vert and Gunna charted at 74 on the Billboard Hot 100.

Lil Baby formed his own label, 4 Pockets Full (initialized 4PF) in 2017. Rappers 42 Dugg and Rylo Rodriguez are signed to the label.

2018–2019: Drip Harder and Street Gossip

After Lil Baby released Harder Than Ever, he released the collaborative mixtape Drip Harder with Gunna on October 5, 2018. The lead single, "Drip Too Hard" went on to become certified Diamond by the RIAA and 4× Platinum by Music Canada. The song peaked at number 4 on the Billboard Hot 100 and was nominated for Best Rap/Sung Performance at the 62nd Annual Grammy Awards. The mixtape was released under the labels Quality Control, YSL Records and Motown/Capitol.

In September 2018, Baby appeared on the Adult Swim television series FishCenter Live. In November 2018, he released his mixtape Street Gossip. In December 2018, Baby collaborated with Yung Gravy on the latter's single, "Alley Oop".

He starred in the 2019 film How High 2, a sequel to the 2001 stoner film How High, which premiered in April 2019, on MTV. In June 2019, Baby and Future released a single titled "Out the Mud". In July 2019, Lil Baby appeared alongside DaBaby on the single "Baby", released on Quality Control's second studio album, Control the Streets, Volume 2. The song peaked at number 21 on the Billboard Hot 100.

In November 2019, Baby released his single "Woah" as the lead single for his second studio album My Turn. The song peaked at number 15 on the Billboard Hot 100. Baby was featured on YouTuber KSI's track "Down Like That" with Rick Ross and British producer S-X, and performed it for KSI's 2018 boxing match against Logan Paul. In November 2019, Baby released a song from the film Queen & Slim titled "Catch the Sun", which subsequently appeared on My Turn.

2020–present: My Turn, The Voice of the Heroes, and It's Only Me
In January 2020, Lil Baby released the second single, "Sum 2 Prove", for his album, and it reached number 16 on the Hot 100. The album, My Turn, was released in February 2020, and debuted at number one on the US Billboard 200. It features guest appearances from Gunna, 42 Dugg, Future, Lil Uzi Vert, Lil Wayne, Moneybagg Yo, Young Thug and Rylo Rodriguez. My Turn produced 12 songs that appeared the Billboard Hot 100 chart, giving him a career total of 47 songs on the chart, tying him with Prince and Paul McCartney. 

Following the release of the album's deluxe version on May 1, My Turn returned to the top spot on the Billboard 200. In June 2020, Lil Baby released the political track "The Bigger Picture", amid the George Floyd protests. The song debuted at number three on the Billboard Hot 100, becoming Lil Baby's highest-charting song as a lead artist. 

His song "We Paid" featuring 42 Dugg from the My Turn deluxe peaked in the top 10 of the Hot 100. In July 2020, Lil Baby was featured on Pop Smoke's "For the Night", from his posthumous debut album, Shoot for the Stars, Aim for the Moon. The track reached number six on the Hot 100. In September 2020, My Turn became the first album of the year to be certified double platinum by the RIAA. "The Bigger Picture" received two nominations at the 63rd Annual Grammy Awards: Best Rap Performance and Best Rap Song.

In March 2021, Lil Baby performed "The Bigger Picture" at the Grammy Awards in 2021 to mostly positive reviews. The following day, another collaboration with Drake, "Wants and Needs", debuted at number two on the Hot 100. Passing a previous peak and debut with "The Bigger Picture" for Jones, becoming his highest-charting song overall.

In June 2021, Lil Baby released his collaborative studio album with Lil Durk, The Voice of the Heroes. The album debuted at number one on the Billboard 200.

In September 2021, Lil Baby was featured on the song "Girls Want Girls" from Drake's sixth studio album, Certified Lover Boy. The song debuted and peaked at number two on the Billboard Hot 100, tying their previous collaboration "Wants and Needs" as Baby's highest-charting song overall.

In February 2022, "Do We Have a Problem?" – a collaboration with Nicki Minaj– was released, along with a music video starring the two. In March 2022, Lil Baby was announced as one of the headliners for J. Cole's Dreamville 2022 Music Festival.

Lil Baby is the subject of the documentary film Untrapped: The Story of Lil Baby, directed by Karam Gill, which premiered at the Tribeca Film Festival in June 2022 and was released on Amazon Prime Video in August 2022.

In April 2022, Lil Baby released the singles "In A Minute", and "Right On", which peaked at number 14 and 13 respectively on the Billboard Hot 100. In September, he released the promotional single "Detox". In October, he released the single "Heyy" as the second single to his forthcoming album It's Only Me. The album released four days later and became his third consecutive number one album.

Personal life
Jones has a son from a relationship with former girlfriend Ayesha. He later dated model and entrepreneur Jayda Cheaves. She appeared in the music video for his song "Close Friends".
On February 18, 2019, Cheaves gave birth to their son.

In May 2021, Jones visited the White House along with the family of George Floyd on the anniversary of Floyd's murder.

Legal issues
On July 7, 2021, after attending Paris Fashion Week events with basketball player James Harden, Jones was arrested on a drug charge by police in the 8th arrondissement of Paris. Harden was stopped but not detained, and both men were soon released.

Discography

Studio albums
 Harder Than Ever (2018)
 My Turn (2020)
 It's Only Me (2022)

Collaborations
 Drip Harder (with Gunna) (2018)
 The Voice of the Heroes (with Lil Durk) (2021)

Filmography
 How High 2 ( 2019; as himself)
 Untrapped: The Story of Lil Baby (2022; as himself)

Awards and nominations

Tours

Headlining
 The Back Outside Tour (2021)

Co-headlining
 One Of Them Ones Tour  (2022)

Notes

References

External links
 
 

1994 births
Living people
21st-century African-American male singers
21st-century American rappers
African-American male rappers
African-American male singer-songwriters
Hardcore hip hop artists
Capitol Records artists
Motown artists
Quality Control artists
Southern hip hop musicians
Rappers from Atlanta
Singer-songwriters from Georgia (U.S. state)
Crips
Trap musicians